Laure Pascale Claire Boulleau (born 22 October 1986) is a French former footballer who played for the Division 1 Féminine club Paris Saint-Germain (PSG). She primarily played as a defender and was a member of the France women's national football team. Boulleau is currently an ambassador for PSG and a consultant for the French television show , which has been broadcast on the French television network Canal+ since 2008.

Career statistics

Club

International

Honours

Club
Paris Saint-Germain
Coupe de France: 2009–10, 2017–18; runner-up: 2007–08, 2013–14

Individual
 UEFA Women's Championship All-Star Team: 2013

References

External links

 
 
 Player stats  at footofeminin.fr

1986 births
Living people
French women's footballers
France women's youth international footballers
France women's international footballers
CNFE Clairefontaine players
Paris Saint-Germain Féminine players
2011 FIFA Women's World Cup players
2015 FIFA Women's World Cup players
Footballers at the 2012 Summer Olympics
Olympic footballers of France
Sportspeople from Clermont-Ferrand
Women's association football fullbacks
Division 1 Féminine players
Footballers from Auvergne-Rhône-Alpes